Weightlifting, for the 2013 Pacific Mini Games, was held at Kafika Hall. Competition started on 3 September and was finished on 5 September 2013.

Medal table
Key:

Medal summary
There were eight men's weight classes and six women's weight classes.

Men's events

Women's events

See also
 Weightlifting at the Pacific Games

References

2013 Pacific Mini Games
2013 in weightlifting
2013 Mini
Weightlifting competitions in Wallis and Futuna